Our Saviour's Lutheran Church is a Lutheran church located in Prince George, British Columbia.

History
Our Saviour's Lutheran Church was established on May 12, 1956, as a mission congregation of the Evangelical Lutheran Church (United States) (ELC). It was the policy of the ELC to send a man to buy property, arrange for the building of a parsonage, and then to call a pastor. Dr. Mars Dale, ELC District President, and Pastor C. Solberg, Regional director of Home Missions, were sent out to Prince George to buy property. After the property at 1094 Douglas Street was purchased, the groundbreaking ceremony for the church building took place on June 2, 1957. On November 3, 1957 the first worship service took place in a partially finished building.

In June 1990, the church at 1094 Douglas Street was sold to Prince George Funeral Services Ltd. and the church building at 3590 Dufferin Avenue was purchased from the Westwood Mennonite Brethren Church. The congregation resides in this building with nearly 170 members.

International relief work
Over the years, Our Saviour's Lutheran Church has been involved in providing aid to various countries. Going back at least to 1975, a quilting group has met in the church basement to make quilts for Canadian Lutheran World Relief to be sent overseas. In 1998, the church was an important part of the Prince George relief efforts to victims of Hurricane Mitch in Honduras.

Lutheran affiliations
In 1968, Our Saviour’s Lutheran Church adopted the Evangelical Lutheran Church of Canada (ELCC) constitution and on January 1, 1985, officially  became a part of the Evangelical Lutheran Church in Canada (ELCIC).

Pastors
 Osborne Olsen 1956 - 1963
John Precht 1963 - 1966
 J.F. Haugen 1966 - 1968
 P.S. Olson 1968 - 1972
 Gerald Getis 1972 - 1980
 Craig Moeller 1980 - 1986
 Ron Sedo 1987 - 1993
 Roland Ziprick 1994 - 2011
 Fleming Blishen 2012–present

Gallery of Pictures

References

External links
 
 Prince George Citizen article about fundraising to obtain a baby grand piano

Lutheran churches in Canada
20th-century Lutheran churches
Churches in British Columbia
Buildings and structures in Prince George, British Columbia
20th-century churches in Canada